This is a list of Danish television related events from 1996.

Events
9 March - Martin Loft and Dorte Andersen are selected to represent Denmark at the 1996 Eurovision Song Contest with their song "Kun med dig". They are selected to be the twenty-sixth Danish Eurovision entry during Dansk Melodi Grand Prix held at the DR Studios in Copenhagen.
19 October - Claus Nielsen, performing as John Lennon wins the second and final season of Stjerneskud.

Debuts

International
19 August -  Bananas in Pyjamas
August -  Thomas the Tank Engine and Friends

Television shows

Ending this year

Stjerneskud (1995-1996)

Births

Deaths

See also
1996 in Denmark